Elijah Voorhees Brookshire (August 15, 1856 – April 14, 1936) was an American lawyer and politician who served three terms as a U.S. Representative from Indiana from 1889 to 1895.

Early life
Born near Ladoga, Indiana, Brookshire attended the common schools, and was graduated from Central Indiana Normal College at Ladoga in August 1878.

He taught in the common schools of Montgomery County, Indiana from 1879 to 1882 and He also engaged in agricultural pursuits. After studying law, he was admitted to the bar in 1883 and commenced practice in Crawfordsville the same year. He married Amanda Harshbarger in 1883.

Career
Brookshire was elected as a Democrat to the Fifty-first, Fifty-second, and Fifty-third Congresses (March 4, 1889 – March 3, 1895). He was an unsuccessful candidate for reelection in 1894 to the Fifty-fourth Congress.

He resumed the practice of law in Washington, D.C., and was admitted to practice before the United States Supreme Court in 1894. He moved to Los Angeles, California, in 1925, and to Seattle, Washington, in 1935, having retired from active law practice in 1925.

Death
He died in Seattle, Washington, April 14, 1936 and was interred in Harshbarger Cemetery, near Ladoga, Indiana.

References

1856 births
1936 deaths
People from Montgomery County, Indiana
Democratic Party members of the United States House of Representatives from Indiana
Burials in Indiana